Fuji Kiseki (15 April 1992 – 28 December 2015) is a Japanese Thoroughbred racehorse and sire. He was the best Japanese two-year-old of his generation in 1994 when he won all three of his starts including the Asahi Hai Sansai Stakes. In the following spring he took his unbeaten run to four with a win in the Yayoi Sho before his racing career was ended by injury. After his retirement from racing he became a very successful breeding stallion. He died in 2015 at the age of 23.

Background
Fuji Kiseki was a brown or black horse standing 1.63 metres high with a white star and a white sock on his right hind leg bred by the Shadai Farm. During his racing career he was owned by Yomoji Saito and trained by Sakae Watanabe.

He was from the first crop of foals sired by Sunday Silence, who won the 1989 Kentucky Derby, before retiring to stud in Japan where he was champion sire on thirteen consecutive occasions. His other major winners included Deep Impact, Stay Gold, Heart's Cry, Manhattan Cafe, Zenno Rob Roy and Neo Universe. Fuji Kiseki's dam Millracer was bred in Virginia and won two minor races in the United States before being exported to Japan. Her grand-dam Millicent was a half-sister to Mill Reef.

Racing career

1994: two-year-old season
Fuji Kiseki made his racecourse debut in an event for previously unraced juveniles over 1200 metres at Niigata Racecourse on 20 August and won by more than five lengths from the filly Shell Queen. At Hanshin Racecourse on 8 October he won the Momiji Stakes from Tayasu Tsuyoshi, a colt who won the Japanese Derby in 1995. On his final start of the year the colt was stepped up to Grade 1 class for the Asahi Hai Sansai Stakes over 1600 metres at Nakayama Racecourse and won from Ski Captain and Kokuto Julian.

1995: three-year-old season
On his three-year-old debut Fuji Kiseki contested the Grade 2 Yayoi Sho (a major trial race for the Satsuki Sho) over 2000 metres at Nakayama and won from Hokkai Rousseau and Hashino Taiyu.

Shortly after the race he sustained a tendon injury which ended his racing career.

Stud record
After the end of his racing career, Fuji Kiseki became a breeding stallion at the Shadai Stallion Station in Hokkaido. Later in his stud career he was shuttled to spend the southern hemisphere breeding season at the Arrowfield Stud in New South Wales. He sired several major winners including Straight Girl, Kane Hekili, Isla Bonita, Sun Classique (Sheema Classic), Danon Chantilly (NHK Mile Cup), Sadamu Patek (Mile Championship), Fine Grain (Takamatsunomiya Kinen) Asian Winds (Victoria Mile), Kinshasa No Kiseki (Takamatsunomiya Kinen) and Koiuta (Victoria Mile). He died in December 2015 after sustaining a "cervical spine injury".

Pedigree

References

1992 racehorse births
2015 racehorse deaths
Racehorses bred in Japan
Racehorses trained in Japan
Thoroughbred family 22-d